The Lord's Taverners Charity Album is the title usually given to an LP album produced by Decca Records in 1965, featuring fourteen artists under the Decca label (Decca LK 4695). Decca itself advertised the album under the name of 14 Great Artists, while the name on the sleeve is 14 New Recordings. In the United States the album was released as England's Greatest Hitmakers (London Records LL 3430).

The sleeve also carries this text:

"The profit from this record will be donated to the LORD’S TAVERNERS for the National Playing Fields Association, together with the royalty which has been personally given by each of these famous artists."

This text is missing from the US version, which also has a more prominent title.

All songs were recorded specially for this album and had never been released before. Most of them have since reappeared on an album and/or CD  sampler however, although in two cases as late as 2009.

List of tracks

(A) = A-side; (B) = B-side; on the sleeve the tracks are given in alphabetical order by artists.

Notes

Charity albums
1965 compilation albums
Decca Records compilation albums
London Records compilation albums
Rock compilation albums